Jane Packer (1959–2011) was a British florist.

Life
Jane Packer was born on 22 September 1959 in Chadwell St Mary in Essex. She worked as a florist and graduated from Southwark College. In 1986, she designed the flowers for the wedding of Sarah Ferguson, and Prince Andrew, Duke of York.
In 1989, she started the Jane Packer Flower School.

From 1993 to 1997, she won a Royal Horticultural Society gold medal at the Hampton Court Palace Flower Show.

Packer was awarded the Prince Philip Medal for outstanding achievements in her career in 2005.

She died at the Hospital of St John and St Elizabeth, on 9 November 2011.

Family
In 1990, she married Gary Alan Wallis; they had one son and one daughter.

Works
 Celebrating with Flowers (1987)
 Flowers for All Seasons (1989)
 New Flower Arranging (1993)
 Complete Guide (1995)
 Living With Flowers (1996)
 Fast Flowers (1998)
 Flowers, Design, Philosophy (2000)
 World Flowers (2003)
 Colour (2007)
 Flower Course (2008)
 At Home With Flowers (2011)

References

External links

1959 births
2011 deaths
Florists
People from Chadwell St Mary